Byley is a village and civil parish in the unitary authority of Cheshire West and Chester and the ceremonial county of Cheshire, England, about 2½ miles north of Middlewich.

According to the 2001 census it had a population of 202, increasing to 235 at the 2011 Census.

This small village is said to be the 'Heart Of Cheshire'

During the Second World War, Vickers-Armstrongs operated a shadow factory at Byley assembling Vickers Wellington bombers. The completed aircraft were towed to the nearby RAF Cranage airfield to be test flown.

See also

Listed buildings in Byley
St John the Evangelist's Church, Byley

References

External links

Villages in Cheshire
Civil parishes in Cheshire